Malawi elects on the national level a head of state and government (Malawi Constitution, 1994 p 27) – the president – and a national assembly. The President and members of the National Assembly, elected simultaneously at a General Election, together form the Malawi Parliament owing to the presidents dual role as head of government and head of state. In practice however, the National Assembly is on par with the executive and is able to exercise oversight functions through investigations and public hearings on various matters including those involving the executive. 

The president and the vice-president are elected jointly to a five-year term through universal suffrage. In order to be duly elected, a presidential candidate and their running mate must have more than 50 percent of the total valid votes cast at the election. If no candidate achieves that threshold, a runoff election is organized within 60 days in which the two most popular candidates contest. The provision for a runoff election was first introduced by the Malawi High Court and subsequently backed by the Malawi Supreme Court of Appeal in 2020 following an electoral petition contesting the results of the 2019 elections which resulted in the invalidation of the presidential election. 

Parliament, following the recommendations of both courts, then amended and passed the presidential, parliamentary and local government elections act in 2022 which was then assented by the current president, Lazarus Chakwera, in February of 2023. In addition to provisions for runoff elections, the act also stipulates the precise procedures by which the electoral process from candidate nominations, the campaigning process, to the vote counting and announcement of results. It also stipulates legal remedies for dealing with complaints and potential violations of the electoral process, including outlining the precise powers of the High Court in addressing electoral irregularities. The amended act is currently in force.  

The National Assembly currently has 193 members, elected for a five-year term in single-seat constituencies. The Malawi Electoral Commission however completed its belated constitutionally mandated review of constituencies and has recommended to parliament an increase to the membership of the National Assembly in line with population trends, settlement patterns, voter accessibility concerns, and other stipulated requirements outlined in the constitution. The review is likely to be adopted and upheld by parliament. 

Malawi is a multi-party system, which means that there are multiple parties as well as a number of independent politicians who do not formally associate with any party.

Malawian citizens who are 18 or over are entitled to vote. Foreign nationals who have lived in Malawi for 7 years can also vote.

Latest elections

2019 Malawian general election

General elections were held in Malawi on 21 May 2019 to elect the President, National Assembly and local government councillors. Incumbent President Peter Mutharika of the Democratic Progressive Party was re-elected, with his party remaining the largest in the National Assembly. However, on 3 February 2020, the Constitutional Court annulled the presidential election results due to evidence of irregularities, and ordered fresh elections be held.

2020 Malawian presidential election

Presidential elections were held in Malawi on 23 June 2020, having originally been scheduled for 19 May and later 2 July. The result of the re-run elections was a victory for Lazarus Chakwera of the Malawi Congress Party, who defeated Mutharika by  margin of 59% to 40%.

Previous Elections

Referendums
 Malawian referendum for democracy, 1993

Elections

 2014 Malawian general election
 2009 Malawian general election
 2004 Malawian general election
 1999 Malawian general election
 1994 Malawian general election

See also
 Cabinet of Malawi, Past cabinets of Malawi
Politics of Malawi
 List of Malawian political parties
 Electoral calendar
 Electoral system

References

External links
Adam Carr's Election Archive
African Elections Database
 International academic conference on the 2009 General Elections
 Video Documentary on Malawi's 2009 General Elections